Forest Hills station is a SEPTA Regional Rail station in Philadelphia, Pennsylvania. Located on Byberry Road near Philmont Avenue, it serves the West Trenton Line to Ewing, New Jersey. The station has off-street parking and a handicapped-accessible platform. In FY 2013, Forest Hills station had a weekday average of 434 boardings and 326 alightings.

Station layout
Forest Hills has two low-level side platforms with a mini high-level platform.

References

External links
SEPTA – Forest Hills Station
 Station from Byberry Road from Google Maps Street View
 The former Forest Hills Reading Station (Existing Railroad Stations in Philadelphia County, Pennsylvania)

SEPTA Regional Rail stations
Former Reading Company stations